Spencer Clark (January 29, 1987 – May 21, 2006) was an American stock car racing driver.

He raced in short tracks in his home state of Nevada and was named a Young Lions National in 2001. In 2003, he competed in four races in the Mechanix Wear SpeedTruck Series, grabbing three pole positions. He was also named Rookie of the Year in the late model series at Las Vegas Motor Speedway. The next season, he finished fifth in points, posting two wins.

In 2005, he made his debut in the NASCAR West Series, running five races. He would run three more the next season, where he also made his Busch Series debut at Las Vegas, where he finished 35th in the 2006 Sam's Town 300.

On May 21, 2006, Clark was on his way back from picking up a car in Charlotte, North Carolina, when the trailer hauling the car fishtailed from a sidewind and caused the driver to lose control and flip the truck outside of Albuquerque, New Mexico. He was pronounced dead at the scene.

He was the son of T. J. Clark who competed in the inaugural 1995 NASCAR SuperTruck Series tour in the No. 23 truck. GMS Racing, whose owner Maurice Gallagher Jr. and son Spencer Gallagher come from Las Vegas, fields the No. 23 in NASCAR and the ARCA Menards Series in Clark's honor.

Motorsports career results

NASCAR
(key) (Bold – Pole position awarded by qualifying time. Italics – Pole position earned by points standings or practice time. * – Most laps led.)

Busch Series

Autozone West Series

References

External links
 Official website
 

1987 births
2006 deaths
NASCAR drivers
People from the Las Vegas Valley
Racing drivers from Las Vegas
Racing drivers from Nevada
Road incident deaths in New Mexico
Sportspeople from Las Vegas